Where We Come From is the debut studio album by Jamaican dancehall artist Popcaan, released on 10 June 2014 by Mixpak Records. A prolific dancehall artist from Jamaica, Popcaan collaborated with several producers on the album: Dre Skull (who also served as the album's Executive Producer), Dubbel Dutch, Anju Blaxx, Jaime YVP and Adde Instrumentals.

"Where We Come From" received critical acclaim upon release, and placed on several year-end critics' lists for 2014. Upon release of the album, Popcaan was featured as the cover star on The Fader, garnered an 8.0 rating at Pitchfork, and received positive reviews from NPR, The Guardian, The Washington Post, Billboard, Dazed, Jamaican Observer, Complex, FACT, and more.

Critical reception

Where We Come From received acclaim from music critics. At Metacritic, which assigns a normalised rating out of 100 to reviews from mainstream critics, the album received an average score of 81, which indicates "universal acclaim", based on 5 reviews.

Track listing

Charts

References

2014 debut albums
Popcaan albums